Earls Colne railway station was located in Earls Colne, Essex.

References

External links
 Earls Colne station on navigable 1946 O. S. map
 

Disused railway stations in Essex
Former Colne Valley and Halstead Railway stations
Railway stations in Great Britain opened in 1882
Railway stations in Great Britain closed in 1962